The 2017 Men's EuroHockey Nations Championship was the 16th edition of the Men's EuroHockey Nations Championship, the biennial international men's field hockey championship of Europe organised by the EHF. It was held from 19 to 27 August 2017 in the Wagener Stadium in Amstelveen, Netherlands. The tournament also served as a qualifier for the 2018 Men's Hockey World Cup, with the winner qualifying.

The hosts and defending champions the Netherlands won their fifth overall title by defeating Belgium 4–2 in the final, while England captured third place by beating Germany 4–2.

Qualified teams
The following teams, shown with pre-tournament world rankings, participated in the 2017 EuroHockey Championship.

Format
The eight teams were split into two groups of four teams. The top two teams advanced to the semi-finals to determine the winner in a knockout system. The bottom two teams played in a new group with the teams they did not play against in the group stage. The last two teams were relegated to the Men's EuroHockey Championship II.

Squads

Results
All times are local (UTC+2).

Preliminary round

Pool A

Pool B

Fifth to eighth place classification

Pool C
The points obtained in the preliminary round against the other team are taken over.

First to fourth place classification

Semi-finals

Third place game

Final

Statistics

Final standings

 Qualification for the 2018 World Cup

 Relegation to the EuroHockey Championship II

Awards

Goalscorers

See also
2017 Men's EuroHockey Championship II
2017 Men's EuroHockey Junior Championship
2017 Women's EuroHockey Nations Championship

References

External links

 
Men's EuroHockey Nations Championship
Men 1
International field hockey competitions hosted by the Netherlands
EuroHockey Nations Championship Men
EuroHockey Nations Championship Men
Sports competitions in Amstelveen
EuroHockey Championship